Muzaffarabad is a city in Azad Kashmir, Pakistan.

Muzaffarabad may also refer to:

Muzaffarabad District
Muzaffarabad Airport
Muzaffarabad (Assembly constituency), a former constituency of the Uttar Pradesh Legislative Assembly, India

See also 
Mozaffarabad (disambiguation), places in Iran
 Muzaffargarh, in Punjab, Pakistan
 Muzaffarpur, in Bihar, India
Muzaffarabad Fort
Muzaffarabad massacre
Muzaffarabad chalo